In United States law, ripeness refers to the readiness of a case for litigation; "a claim is not ripe for adjudication if it rests upon contingent future events that may not occur as anticipated, or indeed may not occur at all." For example, if a law of ambiguous quality has been enacted but never applied, a case challenging that law lacks the ripeness necessary for a decision.

The goal is to prevent premature adjudication; if a dispute is insufficiently developed, any potential injury or stake is too speculative to warrant judicial action. Ripeness issues most usually arise when a plaintiff seeks anticipatory relief, such as an injunction. 

The Supreme Court fashioned a two-part test for assessing ripeness challenges to federal regulations. The case is often applied to constitutional challenges to federal and state statutes as well. The Court said in Abbott Laboratories v. Gardner, :

Without undertaking to survey the intricacies of the ripeness doctrine it is fair to say that its basic rationale is to prevent the courts, through avoidance of premature adjudication, from entangling themselves in abstract disagreements over administrative policies, and also to protect the agencies from judicial interference until an administrative decision has been formalized and its effects felt in a concrete way by the challenging parties. The problem is best seen in a twofold aspect, requiring us to evaluate both the fitness of the issues for judicial decision and the hardship to the parties of withholding court consideration.

In both Abbott Laboratories and its first companion case, Toilet Goods Association v. Gardner, the Court upheld pre-enforcement review of an administrative regulation. However, the Court denied such review in the second companion case because any harm from noncompliance with the FDA regulation at issue was too speculative in the Court's opinion to justify judicial review. Justice Harlan wrote for the Court in all three cases.

The ripeness doctrine should not be confused with the advisory opinion doctrine, another justiciability concept in American law.

See also

References

United States civil procedure
Legal doctrines and principles